Mintlaw (literally meaning a smooth, flat place) is a large village in Aberdeenshire, Scotland lying along the A952 road and is geographically a route centre. The 2001 UK census records a population of 2,647 people.

As the largest settlement within , it supports a number of shops and local amenities such as a police station, library, dental surgery and group doctors' practice.

Aberdeenshire Museums Service is based in a new purpose-built museum building housing Aberdeenshire's large reserve collections, a conservation laboratory and the Discovery Centre. The service also runs another three museums: the nearby Aberdeenshire Farming Museum at Aden Country Park, home to the service nationally recognised agricultural collection, Arbuthnot Museum in Peterhead and Banchory Museum. Aden Country Park also contains a ruined mansion house, forest walks and a theme park.

History
The local area is rich in prehistory and historical features. Somewhat to the south of Mintlaw are a number of prehistoric monuments including Catto Long Barrow, Silver Cairn and many tumuli. In that same vicinity of the Laeca Burn watershed is the point d'appui of historical battles between invading Danes and indigenous Picts.

Mintlaw was formed as a planned village around 1813 by James Ferguson the third Laird of Pitfour. Unlike many of the other planned villages of the time, trees lined the streets and instead of having a square at the centre of the village, it was diamond-shaped. It was later redesigned to become a roundabout on the main route between Aberdeen and Fraserburgh.

Victorian times saw the coming of the railway, the Maud to Peterhead line being built in the 1860s. Mintlaw was a scheduled stop on this line. The station was built a little to the west of the village, perhaps because this was more convenient for the Ferguson family of Pitfour and the Russell family of Aden. More affluent homes were built on Station Road to house businesses and professional people. The Post Office moved closer to the railway and became a Crown Office. Mintlaw Station was the postal address for this whole district for many years. The Crown Post Office was combined with that in Peterhead with the railway closure in the 1960s, and the village post office moved back to South Street. Telephone numbers, too, were Mintlaw Station until the early 1970s when the word Station was dropped.

Although the date of the village's founding is not known for sure, 2013 was marked as its bicentenary year.

Schools
Mintlaw has two primary schools, Mintlaw Primary School and Pitfour Primary School.

It has a large secondary school, Mintlaw Academy which takes pupils from the town and the surrounding area. Mintlaw Academy is situated on Station Road.

References

External links

General Information about Mintlaw

Villages in Aberdeenshire